Brejo da Madre de Deus (Swamp of the Mother of God) is a city located in the state of Pernambuco, Brazil. Located  at 202 km away from Recife, capital of the state of Pernambuco. Has an estimated (IBGE 2020) population of 51,225 inhabitants. It is nationally famous for hosting every easter a large open air theater show designated passion of Christ in New Jerusalem.

Geography

 State - Pernambuco
 Region - Agreste Pernambucano
 Boundaries - Santa Cruz do Capibaribe and Taquaritinga do Norte   (N);  Belo Jardim, São Caetano and Tacaimbó    (S);  Caruaru   (E);   Jataúba    (W).
 Area - 762.09 km2
 Elevation - 627 m
 Hydrography - Capibaribe River
 Vegetation - Subcaducifólia forest
 Climate - Semi arid Hot
 Annual average temperature - 22.0 c
 Distance to Recife - 202 km

Tourism
In Fazenda Nova, which means New Farm, a district of Brejo da Madre de Deus is located the Park of Sculptures and the famous New Jerusalem theater.

The theater city hosts every year in the Easter an outdoor theater show designated Passion of Christ which tell us the history of death and resurrection of Jesus. It is considered the largest open-air theater in the world due to its 100,000 m2 (1.1 million ft2), surrounded by 3500 meters of walls and 70 towers.

Economy
The main economic activities in Brejo da Madre de Deus are based in tourism, commerce and agribusiness, especially tomatoes; and livestock such as cattle, goats, sheep, pigs and poultry.

Economic indicators

Economy by Sector
2006

Health indicators

References

Municipalities in Pernambuco